In urbanism, verticalization is the rapid increase of inner city apartment high-rise buildings, resulting in the development of "vertical" city parts and urban densification.

Although both verticalization and densification processes in cities can provide several advantages, such modifications in the urban landscape were implemented extremely fast, especially after the Second World War.

In order to increase densities, urban housing policies encouraged new forms of vertical building. The process of verticalization is also related to consumer culture and symbols of power.

References 

Urban planning

pt:Verticalização (urbanismo)